The Sauber C34 is a Formula One racing car which Sauber used to compete in the 2015 Formula One season. The C34 was driven by Marcus Ericsson and Felipe Nasr.

History
The car was launched online on 30 January 2015 on the team's website, and it proved to be a vast improvement over the C33. In the opening round of the season, in Australia, the Saubers qualified in eleventh and sixteenth places, with rookie Felipe Nasr ahead of his teammate Marcus Ericsson. They ended, respectively, in fifth and eighth positions. They would score again in the third round, in China, when Nasr finished in eighth place and Ericsson in tenth. Subsequently, the car's competitiveness seemed to decline, mostly due to the financial problems of the team. The most immediate difference can be found in the shorter nose, quite similar in the shape with the ones of the Williams cars, Red Bulls and McLarens. The car also showed new front and rear wings and a slimmer bodywork; thanks to these upgrades – and the high rate of retirements – Nasr was able to finish in tenth position. In the last six races, Sauber managed to collect 10 points from a sixth and a ninth place – both results achieved by Nasr – ending the season with a tally of 36 points and 8th place in the World Constructors' Championship.

Complete Formula One results
(key) (results in bold indicate pole position; results in italics indicate fastest lap)

 Driver failed to finish the race, but was classified as they had completed greater than 90% of the race distance.

References

C34
2015 Formula One season cars